Neyak (also Romanized as Nīkl also known as Neyak-e Bālā) is a village in Hesar-e Amir Rural District, in the Central District of Pakdasht County, Tehran Province, Iran. At the 2006 census, its population was 111, in 31 families.

References 

Populated places in Pakdasht County